Monk Hariton, venerable neomartyr of Kosovo (born Radoslav Lukić) (Seoce, 21 November 1960 — Prizren, 15 June 1999) is a monk of the Serbian Orthodox Church that was killed in the Kosovo War.
He was canonized by the unrecognized uncanonical Church, Eparchy of Raška and Prizren in exile on 16 May 2016 in the monastery of Saint John the Baptist in the village Ljuljaci.

References

1960 births
1999 deaths
Serbian monks
20th-century Christian saints
Serbian saints of the Eastern Orthodox Church
Eastern Orthodox monks